Harmlessness is the absence of harm.

Harmlessness or harmless may also refer to:

Legal 
 Hold harmless, legal term in the contract law concept of indemnity
 Harmless error, a mistaken ruling by a trial judge that does not meet the burden to reverse the original decision

Art and media 
 Harmlessness, 2015 album by The World Is a Beautiful Place & I Am No Longer Afraid to Die
 "Harmlessness", song by Shona Laing on the 1994 album Shona
 Mostly Harmless, the fifth book in The Hitchhiker's Guide to the Galaxy

Other uses 
 Ahimsa, meaning "not to injure" and "compassion" and refers to a key virtue in Indian religions
 Harmless serotine, species of vesper bat
 Harmless (sublabel), label of the Demon Music Group